The 1997 Patriot League men's basketball tournament was played at Stabler Arena in Bethlehem, Pennsylvania, and Alumni Hall in Annapolis, Maryland, after the conclusion of the 1996–97 regular season. Top seed Navy defeated #2 seed , 76–75 in the championship game, to win its second Patriot League Tournament title. The Midshipmen earned an automatic bid to the 1997 NCAA tournament as #15 seed in the West region.

Format
All eight league members participated in the tournament, with teams seeded according to regular season conference record. Play began with the quarterfinal round.

Bracket

References

Tournament
Patriot League men's basketball tournament
Patriot League men's basketball tournament
Patriot League men's basketball tournament
Patriot League men's basketball tournament